Efraim Medina Reyes is a Colombian writer born June 29, 1967 in Cartagena, Colombia. He is also the bassist and composer of the  rock band, he currently lives between Colombia and Vicenza, Italy. He is influenced by American cinema, jazz music and works of Andrés Caicedo, an emblematic figure of contemporary Colombian literature. As a writer, Efraim Medina Reyes emphasizes the hectic life of urban youths. He uses narrative techniques such as collage.

Some of his works were translated and published in Italian by Feltrinelli, Portuguese by Planeta, French by 13e Note Editions and Finnish by Ivan Rotta & Co.

Major works
, short stories. 
, novel. 
, novel. 
, novel. 
, poems et flash fictions. 
, novel.

Awards and honors
1985 Premio Nacional de Poesía ICFES
1986 Concurso Revista Aracataca
1986 Concurso Nacional de Cuento de Barranquilla
1986 Concurso Nacional de Cuento de Medellín
1987 Concurso Nacional de Novela Ciudad de Pereira.
1995 Premio Nacional de Literatura Colcultura for Cinema árbol y otros cuentos
1997 Concurso nacional de novela del Ministerio de Cultura for Erase una vez el amor pero tuve que matarlo
1999 Beca del Fondo Mixto de Cultura de Cartagena

References

External links
7 Torpes Band songs 
Yesterday a poem 
Five short fictions 
Excerpt of the novel Sexualidad de la Pantera Rosa 
Articles by Efraim Medina Reyes in Soho 
Presentation of the novel  on Literaturas Comunicación SL 
Interview by Entretenimiento & Cultura 
Efraim Medina's Facebook Page 
Efraim Medina's Twitter Account 

Living people
20th-century Colombian novelists
21st-century Colombian novelists
Colombian male novelists
Colombian male short story writers
Colombian short story writers
1964 births